Boogie board may refer to:

 Bodyboard, a device for riding waves.
 Boogie board (product), an electronic device for note taking that comes in various colors